Fischeria may refer to:

Fischeria (fly), a genus of flies in the family Tachinidae
Fischeria (plant), a genus of plants in the family Apocynaceae
MV Fischeria, a ship